Hamta Pass is a corridor in the Himalayas, between the Chandra Valley in Lahaul and the Kullu valley of Himachal Pradesh, India. The pass is named after Hamta Village, below Sethan village. Lower Himalayan shepherds use the pass in summer for its high altitude grasslands in the summer, when the desert of Lahaul is barren.

Description 
The pass includes vertical rock walls, waterfalls, hanging glaciers, pinewoods, rhododendron forests, open meadows, and small lakes, as well as 6000 metre tall peaks such as Mt. Deo Tibba and Mount Indrasan. Wildflowers and herbs grow between 3000 meters to 3800 meters.

Treks 
Hikers travel from the Kullu valley through Hamta Pass, and into the region of Lahaul. The route includes glaciers and fast-flowing rivers, making it challenging but doable for some beginners. Some hikers continue to Chandrataal lake.

The nearest hub is Manali, in Himachal Pradesh. Most itineraries include transport from Manali to Jobri, from where the trek begins. Depending on the trek itinerary, it typically takes 3 to 4 days to complete the trek. Hikers may stop at Chika, Balu ka Gera, or Chatru.

Gallery

Panorama view (3777m)

References

Mountain passes of Himachal Pradesh
Geography of Lahaul and Spiti district
Geography of Kullu district